The Brick House  is a private house in the Westbourne Grove area of west London that was short-listed for the 2006 Stirling Prize for Architecture. It was designed by the firm of architects Caruso St John and constructed by Harris Calnan Construction with service engineering by Mendick Waring and structural engineering by Price & Myers.

The project inserted a new house, accessed through an archway into the end of a Victorian city-centre street. It was completed in May 2005.

Site and brief
The site was backland development in the shape of a horse's head. The design had to accommodate not only restrictions in height (single story), but it was surrounded by overlooking buildings on three sides. The solution involved partly excavating the lower floor and the use of skylights.

See also
2005 in architecture

References

External links
Caruso St John Architects, Brick House
Icon Eye, The Brick House, 2005
Brick Development Association: London's Brick House
RIBA: Brick House London W2
E-Architect: Brick House England, West London property with location map
 

Buildings and structures completed in 2005
Houses in the City of Westminster